Tom Washington may refer to:

 Trooper Washington (1944–2004), American basketball player
 Tom Washington (baseball), American Negro league catcher and manager